This is a list of stratigraphic units from which dinosaur body fossils have been recovered. Although Dinosauria is a clade which includes modern birds, this article covers only Mesozoic stratigraphic units. Units listed are all either formation rank or higher (e.g. group).

By diversity 
Here the units are sorted by the number of genera that have been reported as being represented in their respective fossil yields. Since the creation or synonymy of genera can be subjective, the sorting of the units can only roughly approximate their known paleobiodiversities.

>10

6-10

1-5

Indeterminate 

This list includes stratigraphic units that have produced dinosaur remains, although none of these remains have been referred to a specific genus.

By preservation

Bone beds and mass graves

Lagerstatten

See also 

List of dinosaur-bearing rock formations

Footnotes

References 
 Weishampel, David B.; Dodson, Peter; and Osmólska, Halszka (eds.): The Dinosauria, 2nd, Berkeley: University of California Press. 861 pp. .

Mesozoic fossil record
Body fossils